Brenthia trilitha is a species of moth of the family Choreutidae. It was described by Edward Meyrick in 1907. It is found on the Solomon Islands.

References

Brenthia
Moths described in 1907